The Brittain-Garvin House, at 411 North 9th St. in Duncan, Oklahoma, was built around 1916.  It was listed on the National Register of Historic Places in 2000.  The listing included three contributing buildings and a contributing object.

It is a two-story, Prairie School house.  It is roughly L-shaped and has a porte cochere.  It was expanded and wooden awnings were added around 1937.

References

National Register of Historic Places in Stephens County, Oklahoma
Prairie School architecture
Houses completed in 1916